Pterolophia crassipes is a species of beetle in the family Cerambycidae. It was described by Wiedemann in 1823, originally under the genus Lamia. It is known from Malaysia, the Philippines, Borneo, Java, and Sumatra.

References

crassipes
Beetles described in 1823